San Jacinto Unified School District is a public school district located in the central part of Riverside County in California. The district services the city of San Jacinto, California and the unincorporated area of Soboba Hot Springs, California.

List of Schools

Elementary schools
 HeadStart/State Preschool
 Megan Cope Elementary (opened in 2010)
 De Anza Elementary (opened in late 1980s)
 Jose Antonio Estudillo Elementary (opened in 2004)
 Edward Hyatt Elementary (opened in 1960s)
 Park Hill Elementary (opened in 1991)
 Clayton A. Record Jr. Elementary (opened in 2004)
 San Jacinto Elementary (opened in 1930s)

Middle schools
 Monte Vista Middle School
 North Mountain Middle School
 San Jacinto Leadership Academy (Magnet School)

High school
 San Jacinto High School

Alternative schools
 Mountain View High School (Continuation High School)
 Mt. Heights Academy (Independent Study for grades 6–12)

References

External links
 

School districts in Riverside County, California
San Jacinto, California